Mirko Tomassoni (born 24 April 1969) is a Sammarinese politician, who served as Captain Regent of San Marino for the six-month term from October 2007 to April 2008 and the second term from October 2018 until April 2019. He served together with Alberto Selva the first term and with Luca Santolini his second term. He is a Member of the Parliament of San Marino, Member of the ICD Advisory Board, Minister of Culture of San Marino.

Life
Mirko Tomassoni was born in Borgo Maggiore on 24 April 1969. He entered the political life of the country beginning from 1992. In 1999 he was in a car accident that changed his life and deprived him of active lifestyle. He was elected to the local town council three times before his being elected to the Grand and General Council.

Tomassoni was elected in June 2006 to the Grand and General Council as an independent on the list of the Party of Socialists and Democrats. On 1 October 2007 Mirko Tomassoni was elected as one of the heads of state, making him the first disabled person to ever have been elected as captain regent. According to the laws of San Marino after his stay at the post of Head of State of San Marino he returned to the civil life. He seeks to improve awareness of disability among all people and does all the best to help such people in their everyday life. He wrote the book Bolivia 2013 which was published on 19 March 2014.

References

External links
Personal website 

1969 births
Living people
People from Borgo Maggiore
Captains Regent of San Marino
Members of the Grand and General Council
Politicians with disabilities
Party of Socialists and Democrats politicians
Sammarinese people with disabilities
21st-century Sammarinese politicians